Golam Helal Morshed Khan is a retired Major General of the Bangladesh Army and veteran of the Bangladesh Liberation War. He was awarded Bir Bikrom, third highest gallantry award, for his actions in the war. He participated in the 1996 Bangladeshi coup d'état attempt.

Career 
During the Bangladesh Liberation War in 1971, Khan was lieutenant in the Mukti Bahini and served in Kalkalia of Sector 3. This second was commanded by Major K. M. Shafiullah who was later replaced by Major A. N. M. Nuruzzaman. The neighboring camp was commanded by M Harun-Ar-Rashid who had borrowed weapons from Khan's camp. Khan fought in the battle to liberate Ashuganj in a joint operation between the Indian Army and the Mukti Bahini. He fought in the first and second battle of Belonia.

Khan fought in the Liberation of Mirpur in 1972 as a captain in the 2nd East Bengal Regiment of the Bangladesh Army and commander of Delta Company. After the surrender of Pakistan Army and the independence of Bangladesh, Mirpur was the last stronghold of pro-Pakistan forces. He commanded the Bangladeshi forces composed 82 personnel of Bangladesh Army and 200 personnel of Bangladesh Police. His commanding officer was Major Moinul Hossain Chowdhury who sent Second Lieutenant Selim Mohammad Kamrul Hasan, who was killed in action, to support him. The battle saw heavy gunfights between his forces and collaborators of Pakistan Army. After losing 42 army personnel and 82 police personnel Khan retreated from Mirpur to an Indian army base. Mirpur was liberated after reinforcements were sent from different cantonments of Bangladesh.

Major General Khan was the GOC of Bogra Cantonment in 1996. He criticised the government following the February 1996 Bangladeshi general election, which was boycotted by all parties except the ruling Bangladesh Nationalist Party who won, and in response President of Bangladesh Abdur Rahman Biswas sacked him and deputy chief of Bangladesh Rifles, Brigadier General Hameedur Rehman. Army chief general Abu Saleh Mohammed Nasim revolted and launched the failed 1996 Bangladeshi coup d'état attempt with support of troops from Bogra Cantonment. In the June 1996 Bangladeshi general election, the Awami League was elected to power.

Khan is the chairman of Bangladesh Muktijoddha Sangsad.

References 

Living people
Bangladesh Army generals
Year of birth missing (living people)
Mukti Bahini personnel
Recipients of the Bir Bikrom